Ivan Duane Irwin (March 13, 1927 – February 11, 2019) was an American-born Canadian professional ice hockey defenseman who played 155 games in the National Hockey League for the New York Rangers and Montreal Canadiens. He was born in Chicago, Illinois and raised in Toronto, Ontario. Irwin died in 2019, aged 91.

References

External links

1927 births
2019 deaths
American men's ice hockey defensemen
Boston Olympics players
Canadian ice hockey defencemen
Ice hockey people from Chicago
Montreal Canadiens players
New York Rangers players
Ice hockey people from Toronto